A set of twelve concertos was published by Estienne Roger in 1716-1717 under Antonio Vivaldi's name, as his Opus 7. They were in two volumes, each containing concertos numbered 1-6. Of the set, ten were for violin solo; the other two were for oboe solo. The authenticity of some of the works included has long been doubted by scholars. Three are now considered spurious (i.e. not in fact by Vivaldi) for stylistic reasons. They are: No. 1 in B-flat major for oboe, RV Anh. 143 (formerly RV 465); No. 7 in B-flat major for oboe, RV Anh. 142 (formerly RV 464); and No. 9 in B-flat major for violin, RV Anh. 153 (formerly RV 373).

Concerto No. 1 for oboe, strings, and basso continuo in B-flat major, RV Anh. 143 (inauthentic)
Allegro
Adagio
Allegro
Concerto No. 2 for violin, strings and basso continuo in C major, RV 188
Allegro
Largo
Allegro
Concerto No. 3 for violin, strings and basso continuo in G minor, RV 326
Allegro
Grave
Presto
Concerto No. 4 for violin, strings and basso continuo in A minor, RV 354
Allegro
Adagio
Allegro
Concerto No. 5 for violin, strings and basso continuo in F major, RV 285a
Allegro
Grave - Adagio (Grave)
Allegro
Concerto No. 6 for violin, strings and basso continuo in B-flat major, RV 374
Allegro
Largo
Allegro
Concerto No. 7 for oboe, strings and basso continuo in B-flat major, RV Anh. 142 (inauthentic)
Allegro
Largo
Allegro
Concerto No. 8 for violin, strings and basso continuo in G major, RV 299
Allegro assai
Largo, cantabile
Allegro
Concerto No. 9 for violin, strings and basso continuo in B-flat major, RV Anh. 153 (inauthentic)
Allegro
Grave
Alla breve
Concerto No. 10 for violin, strings and basso continuo in F major, "Il Ritiro", RV 294a
Allegro
Adagio
Allegro
Concerto No. 11 for violin, strings and basso continuo in D major, RV 208a
Allegro
Grave
Allegro
Concerto No. 12 for violin, strings and basso continuo in D major, RV 214
Allegro
Grave assai
Allegro

References

Vivaldi 07
Vivaldi 07
Concertos by Antonio Vivaldi